Five naval vessels have served in the Royal French Navy, the French Navy of the Republic, the French Imperial Navy   and French Navy have been named Indomptable:

  (1789–1805), a double-deck 80-gun ship which fought at the Glorious First of June and the Battle of Trafalgar.
 Indomptable (1810–1813), a ship captured by the English 38-gun frigate .
  (1877–1910), a coastal battleship.
  (1976–2005), a Redoutable-class submarine.

Insignia
The destroyer L'Indomptable, launched in 1934, was the first to carry the insignia of the French Foreign Legion. The ship's first commander asked Général Paul-Frédéric Rollet to have the Legion as the ship's patron and guardian. The fanion of L'Indomptable was green and red, with the cannons depicted carrying the words "Magenta", "Camerone", "Tuyen Quang", and "Laffaux" (after the battles of Magenta, Camarón, Tuyên Quang and the Aisne – four engagements in which the Legion distinguished itself), and displaying the Legion's grenade as an insignia. The nuclear ballistic missile submarine Indomptable launched in 1974 continued the association.

Gallery

See also 

List of Escorteurs of the French Navy
List of battleships of France

References

French Navy ship names